San Lorenzo Canton is a canton of Ecuador, located in the Esmeraldas Province.  Its capital is the town of San Lorenzo.  Its population at the 2001 census was 28,180

Demographics
Ethnic groups as of the Ecuadorian census of 2010:
Afro-Ecuadorian  72.2%
Mestizo  19.1%
Indigenous  5.3%
White  2.6%
Montubio  0.6%
Other  0.3%

References

Cantons of Esmeraldas Province